Monotonicity of entailment is a property of many logical systems that states that the hypotheses of any derived fact may be freely extended with additional assumptions.  In sequent calculi this property can be captured by an inference rule called weakening, or sometimes thinning, and in such systems one may say that entailment is monotone if and only if the rule is admissible.   Logical systems with this property are occasionally called monotonic logics in order to differentiate them from non-monotonic logics.

Weakening rule

To illustrate, consider the natural deduction sequent:

Γ  C

That is, on the basis of a list of assumptions Γ, one can prove C. Weakening, by adding an assumption A, allows one to conclude:

Γ, A  C

For example, the syllogism "All men are mortal. Socrates is a man. Therefore Socrates is mortal." can be weakened by adding a premise: "All men are mortal. Socrates is a man. Cows produce milk. Therefore Socrates is mortal." The validity of the original conclusion is not changed by the addition of premises.

Non-monotonic logics

In most logics, weakening is either an inference rule or a metatheorem if the logic doesn't have an explicit rule. Notable exceptions are:

 Strict logic or relevant logic, where every hypothesis is necessary for the conclusion.
 Linear logic which disallows arbitrary Idempotency of entailment.

See also 

 Contraction
 Exchange rule
 Substructural logic
 No-cloning theorem

Logical consequence
Theorems in propositional logic